Titanium mining in Africa has been beset by environmental problems due to the polluting nature of processing rutile, a principal titanium ore.  Titanium production in Africa includes the following principal countries and companies.

Kenya
Base Titanium of Australia
Tiomin Resources of Canada
Tiomin Kenya
Location: Eldoret; Kwale

Mozambique
Kenmare Resources of Ireland
Kenmare Moma Mining
Kenmare Moma Processing
Moma Mineral Sands Project
Location Nampula Province
Involves investment from African Development Bank (ADB); European Investment Bank (BEI), the Development Bank of Southern Africa (DBSA); and the German Development Bank (KfW). 
Principally mining Ilmenite

Sierra Leone
Sierra Rutile of Ohio; since 1967
Location:Bonthe/Port Loko District; Tonkoli District
Branch Energy UK
Diamond Works
Executive Outcomes RSA
Sandline International
Sierra Leone Ore and Metal Company since 1963
Location: Mokanji Hills in the Southern Province
See: 1994 Mines and Minerals Act (Sierra Leone)

South Africa
BHP
Anglo American - Namakwa Sands mines
Richards Bay Minerals RBM
Kumba Resources - and subsidiary Ticor Limited
Southern Mining Corporation - Bothaville heavy mineral occurrence
Mineral Commodities of Australia Xolobeni mine, Transkei Coast.
East London Development Zone Corporation (ELDZC) - associated smelting project''

See also
Aluminium in Africa
Copper in Africa
Iron ore in Africa
Platinum in Africa
Uranium in Africa

References

External links

Don't Let Titanium Become The Curse Of Kwale; Opinion by Sam Wainaina, The East African (Nairobi), 18 January 2001
Titanium mining in Mozambique, from Afrol
Sierra Leone titanium mining overview from Project Underground
Mining in Sierra Leone, Encyclopedia of the Nations
MBendi - Republic of South Africa - Heavy Minerals Mining - page
MBendi - Africa - Heavy Minerals Mining - page

Mining in Africa
Africa
Mining in Kenya
Mining in Mozambique
Mining in Sierra Leone
Mining in South Africa